The Golden Child is a 1977 mystery novel by the British author Penelope Fitzgerald, her first published work of fiction. Written while her husband was terminally ill, and partly for his benefit, the novel offers a satirical version of the 1972 Treasures of Tutankhamun exhibition at the British Museum, and pokes fun at museum politics, academic scholars, and Cold War spying.

Plot 
In London in January 1973 the Museum (unnamed in the novel) is exhibiting for the first time anywhere the golden Garamantian treasures, on loan from the Garamantian government, that had been discovered years earlier by the eminent archaeologist Sir William Simpkin. Sir William, wealthy and now elderly, is retained by the Museum as a figurehead, largely because the Museum’s director, Sir John Allison, expects to receive a large bequest on the old man's death. Huge crowds queue for hours for a brief glimpse under poor lighting of the two most famous exhibits: the Golden Child and the Ball of Golden Twine. Rumours circulate that the Child is cursed.

Sir William shows little interest in the exhibition, but he does ask to take a closer look at one of the many clay tablets that accompany the treasures. Late at night, while returning the tablet to its case at Sir William’s request, a Junior Exhibition Officer, Waring Smith, is attacked and partly strangled, apparently with the Golden Twine.

The German Garamantologist Professor Untermensch tells the Director that all the artefacts in the exhibition are fakes. Sir John decides that a second opinion is needed; this has to be obtained covertly because of the political sensitivities of the Garamantian loan. He dispatches Smith to Moscow, along with one of the lesser treasures, to get the opinion of the Russian Garamantologist Professor Semyonov. The Director expects that no one will be suspicious of Smith because of his lowly position. Untermensch, however, thinks that the Soviets will assume he is a spy, and he shadows him. The Soviets do indeed make that assumption and, to show that they know the game the British are playing, they allow Smith and Untermensch into the Kremlin to view the real Garamantian treasures. Smith discovers that there is no such person as Semyonov.

Smith returns, demoralised, and is temporarily detained on his arrival by a man from the Ministry of Defence who wants to know what his business was in Russia. Trying to explain himself, he mentions Sir William, whom he expects will clarify the reasons for his visit, only to learn that Sir William has been found dead, trapped between two sliding steel shelf units in the Museum library. A warder, Jones, is also later found dead: he has fallen from a fifth-floor window.

Len Coker, a Museum technician, reveals that the tablet Smith took back to its case was a fake that he had made himself on Sir William’s instructions. Untermensch decodes the Garamantian characters on the tablet to reveal Sir William’s message: that he revokes his bequest to Sir John Allison. Accused of murder, Sir John pulls a gun and flees. Cornered, he shoots himself and crashes down on the exhibits, revealing them for the fakes they are. The staff patch up the exhibits so that they look convincing in the dim light, just in time for the evening opening.

Principal characters 

 Sir William Simpkin: elderly archaeologist, discoverer of the Golden Child
 Sir John Allison: Museum Director
 Marcus Hawthorne-Mannering: Keeper of Funerary Art
 Waring Smith: Junior Exhibition Officer
 Professor Heinrich Untermensch: German Garamantologist
 Dr Tite-Live Rochegrosse-Bergson (Schwarz): French cultural anthropologist
 Professor Cyril Ivanovitch Semyonov: supposed Russian Garamantologist
 Jones Jones: Warder, unofficial retainer to Sir William
 Len Coker: Technician, Conservation and Technical Services Department.
 Dousha Vartarian: Secretary to Sir William Simpkin
 Miss Rank: Secretary to Sir John Allison.

Background 

Fitzgerald wrote the novel to amuse her husband, who was terminally ill with bowel cancer. She also wanted to deal with the annoyance she had felt when visiting The Treasures of Tutankhamun exhibition at the British Museum in 1972 (having speculated that everything in it was a forgery), and also to write about someone who had been unpleasant to her when she was visiting museums to research her book on Burne-Jones.

Fitzgerald’s original manuscript for the novel, to be called The Golden Opinion, was much longer than the published version. It included chapters on the continuing cover-up of the fraud, as well as scenes in which the Cabinet Secretary discusses the possibility of public disorder sparked by the fake exhibition. The publisher told her that they needed to be cut, along with the entirety of a sub-plot and several additional characters.
 
Fitzgerald's publisher suggested that she should write more novels featuring Professor Untermensch as a recurring detective. She did indeed start work on two Untermensch thrillers, but in the end thought it best not to be typecast.

Critical reception

H. R. F. Keating, reviewing the book as a crime novel for The Times, referred to the novel’s good joking (if occasionally in-joking), its muted social criticism, and its good writing if somewhat consciously so.

Writing in the Library Journal, Henri C. Veit called the novel "A muddle of violence and intrigue that I wouldn't have missed for the world."

In a 2014 introduction to the Fourth Estate paperback reissue Charles Saumarez Smith called the book "taut, finely plotted [and] richly comic, with some of the elements of exaggerated satire characteristic of a campus novel."

References

Bibliography
 
 

1977 British novels
Fiction set in 1973
Novels by Penelope Fitzgerald
Novels about museums
Cold War spy novels
British crime novels
Novels set in London
Novels set in Moscow
Gerald Duckworth and Company books
1977 debut novels